Raymond Lamarr Webber (born June 1, 1989) is a former American football wide receiver.He was signed by the Tampa Bay Buccaneers as an undrafted free agent in 2011. He played college football for the University of Arkansas at Pine Bluff.

Early years
Webber was born in Saint Louis, Missouri. He attended Cleveland NJROTC High School located in South Saint Louis, Missouri.  Webber transferred to Clyde C. Miller Career Academy  his sophomore year. Due to the transfer, Webber was not allowed to play any sports his first year at Clyde C. Miller.  Webber excelled at three sports while attending Miller Career Academy, basketball, football, and track.

College career
Webber attended the University of Arkansas-Pine Bluff where he majored in business marketing. He was a four-year letterman in football. He was UAPB's record holder for receptions in a game, and currently is in yards in a game, receptions in a single season and yards in a single season. Receptions in a career and Yards in a Career. Webber ended his senior season becoming the second player in Southwest Athletic Conference history to ever record 100 receptions in a single season (101) the only other was Jerry Rice (103).

While at Pine Bluff, he joined Alpha Phi Alpha fraternity.

Professional career

Tampa Bay Buccaneers
Webber signed with the Tampa Bay Buccaneers as an undrafted free agent in July 2011. He was sidelined with a hamstring injury and put on the injured reserve list on August 15, 2011.

New York Jets
Webber was signed by the New York Jets on June 19, 2012. He was waived on August 25, 2012.

Arizona Rattlers
Webber signed with the Arizona Rattlers of the Arena Football League for the 2013 season. Before the season began, Webber was placed on the other league exempt list when he signed with the Calgary Stampeders. Webber was activated on July 11, 2013, but refused to report to the Rattlers.

Calgary Stampeders
Webber signed with the Calgary Stampeders, of the Canadian Football League, during their 2013 training camp. Webber was cut on June 11, 2013.

References

External links
 Just Sports Stats
 

1989 births
Living people
Players of American football from St. Louis
African-American players of American football
American football wide receivers
Arkansas–Pine Bluff Golden Lions football players
Tampa Bay Buccaneers players
Seattle Seahawks players
New York Jets players
Arizona Rattlers players
Calgary Stampeders players
Miami Dolphins players
Green Bay Packers players
21st-century African-American sportspeople
20th-century African-American people